Marching to Mars is the tenth studio album by American rock singer-songwriter and vocalist Sammy Hagar, and his first post-Van Halen solo album. It features various musicians on different songs. It was released on May 20, 1997, by MCA Records, which had by that point acquired his former label, Geffen Records. "Little White Lie" was a major mainstream rock hit, topping the mainstream rock tracks chart for five weeks.

Song information
 "Leaving the Warmth of the Womb" amounted to a Montrose reunion. The sessions also had a rerecording of the Montrose classic, "Rock Candy", which can be found on the CD single release of "Little White Lie".
"Kama" is described by Hagar as the Sanskrit translation of "love". It was written for his daughter, whom he had given the word as a name.
 Written while Hagar was still in Van Halen, "Amnesty Is Granted" was previously recorded by Meat Loaf for his album Welcome to the Neighborhood. Hagar played guitar and sang backing vocals on that version. According to Hagar's autobiography, he wrote the song about being able to be with his newfound love away from his ex-wife Betsy.
 "Salvation on Sand Hill" is co-written by Brother Cane's vocalist/lyricist/guitarist Damon Johnson who says, "...Sammy was inspired to write those lyrics after I showed him a book I had been reading: Salvation on Sand Mountain, which is about the worship rituals of some churches in Northeast Alabama..."

Track listing

Singles
 "Little White Lie"  US (Track Factory TRK5P-3964)
 "Little White Lie" b/w "Rock Candy"  Japan (MCA Victor MVCE-9002)
 "Little White Lie" b/w "Rock Candy" b/w "Ether"  Europe (Track Factory TRD 49036)
 "Both Sides Now" (Radio Edit) b/w "Both Sides Now" (Album version)  US (Track Factory TRK5P-90091)
 "Both Sides Now" (Radio Edit)  US (GKS Entertainment 8125)
 "Marching To Mars" (Radio Edit) b/w "Marching To Mars" (Album version)  US (Track Factory TRK5P-4011)
 "On The Other Hand" b/w "Right Now" (live)  US (Track Factory TRK5P-4158)
 "Kama" (Radio Edit) b/w "Kama" (Album version)  Asia (MCA TRK5P-4095)

Personnel
All tracks were produced by Mike Clink, except for the title track, which was co-produced by Clink and Mickey Hart.

Little White Lie
 Lead vocals and guitar – Sammy Hagar
 Drums – Denny Carmassi
 Bass guitar – Jonathan Pierce
 Guitar – Slash
 Slide guitar and dobro – Roy Rogers
 Harmonica – Huey Lewis
 Percussion – Luis Conte, Mickey Hart, Giovanni Hidalgo

Salvation On Sand Hill
 Lead vocals and guitar – Sammy Hagar
 Drums – Denny Carmassi
 Bass guitar – Jonathan Pierce
 Rhythm and solo guitar – Damon Johnson
 Keyboards – Jesse Harms

Who Has The Right?
 Lead/background vocals and guitar – Sammy Hagar
 Drums – Denny Carmassi
 Bass guitar – Jonathan Pierce
 Keyboards – Jesse Harms
 Background vocals – Eric Martin, Mickey Thomas

Would You Do It For Free?
 Lead/background vocals and guitar – Sammy Hagar
 Drums – Denny Carmassi
 Bass guitar – Bootsy Collins
 Keyboards and background vocals – Jesse Harms

Leaving The Warmth of the Womb
 The original lineup of Montrose
 Lead vocals and guitar – Sammy Hagar
 Drums – Denny Carmassi
 Bass vocals – Bill Church
 Acoustic, rhythm and solo guitar – Ronnie Montrose
Kama
 Lead/background vocals and guitar solo – Sammy Hagar
 Drums – Matt Sorum
 Bass guitar – Jonathan Pierce
 Guitars – Mike Landau
 Keyboards and background vocals – Jesse Harms
 Background vocals – Aaron Hagar, Mickey Thomas

On The Other Hand
 Lead/background vocals and acoustic/electric guitar – Sammy Hagar
 Drums – Denny Carmassi
 Bass guitar – Jonathan Pierce
 Acoustic and slide guitar – Damon Johnson
 Percussion – Mickey Hart, Giovanni Hidalgo

Both Sides Now
 Lead vocals and guitar – Sammy Hagar
 Drums – Denny Carmassi
 Bass guitar – Jonathan Pierce
 Keyboards and background vocals – Jesse Harms
 Percussion – Luis Conte, Mickey Hart, Giovanni Hidalgo

The Yogi's So High (I'm Stoned)
 Lead vocals and guitar – Sammy Hagar
 Drums – Denny Carmassi
 Bass guitar – Jonathan Pierce
 Keyboards and background vocals – Jesse Harms

Amnesty Is Granted
 Lead vocals and guitar – Sammy Hagar
 Drums – Denny Carmassi
 Bass guitar – Jonathan Pierce
 Keyboards – Jesse Harms

Marching To Mars
 Lead vocals, bass guitar and guitar – Sammy Hagar
 Drums – Denny Carmassi
 Sequencing and percussion – Mickey Hart
 Percussion – Giovanni Hidalgo
 Background vocals – Arnie's Army, Derrick Hawkins, Harley Di Nardo, Dave Cartategui, Kari Hagar

Releases
 MCA Victor (Japan) : MVCE 240 10
 Track Factory (Europe) : TRD 11627
 Track Factory/MCA Records (Canada) : TRKSD 11627

References

External links
Lyrics from Sammy's official site

Sammy Hagar albums
1997 albums
MCA Records albums